Becket is a 1964 British historical drama film about the historic, tumultuous relationship between Henry II of England and his friend-turned-bishop Thomas Becket. It is a dramatic film adaptation of the 1959 play Becket or the Honour of God by Jean Anouilh made by Hal Wallis Productions and released by Paramount Pictures. It was directed by Peter Glenville and produced by Hal B. Wallis with Joseph H. Hazen as executive producer. The screenplay was written by Edward Anhalt based on Anouilh's play. The music score was by Laurence Rosenthal, the cinematography by Geoffrey Unsworth and the editing by Anne V. Coates.

The film stars Richard Burton as Thomas Becket and Peter O'Toole as King Henry II, with John Gielgud as King Louis VII, Donald Wolfit as Gilbert Foliot, Paolo Stoppa as Pope Alexander III, Martita Hunt as Empress Matilda, Pamela Brown as Queen Eleanor, Siân Phillips, Felix Aylmer, Gino Cervi, David Weston and Wilfrid Lawson.

Restored prints of Becket were re-released in 30 cinemas in the US in early 2007, following an extensive restoration from the film's YCM separation protection masters. The film was released on DVD by MPI Home Video in May 2007 and on Blu-ray Disc in November 2008. The new film prints carry a Dolby Digital soundtrack, although the soundtrack of the original film, which originally opened as a roadshow theatrical release, was also in stereo.

Becket won the Academy Award for Best Adapted Screenplay, and was nominated for eleven other awards, including for Best Picture, Best Director, Best Supporting Actor, and twice for Best Actor.

Background and production
The original French play on which the film is based was given its first performance in Paris in 1959. It opened on Broadway with Laurence Olivier as Becket and Anthony Quinn as King Henry II in a production directed by Peter Glenville, who later went on to direct the film version. The play opened in London in a production by Peter Hall with Eric Porter and Christopher Plummer. O'Toole was originally signed to play Henry II in the production, but broke the contract before rehearsals began to take the lead in David Lean's film of Lawrence of Arabia.

The film was made at Shepperton Studios, England, and on location at Alnwick Castle, Bamburgh Castle and Bamburgh Beach in Northumberland.

Peter O'Toole went on to play King Henry II once more in The Lion in Winter (1968) with Katharine Hepburn as Queen Eleanor.

Siân Phillips, who plays Gwendolen, was Peter O'Toole's wife at the time of filming.

Synopsis
During the late 12th century, about 100 years after the Norman conquest (1066), the Normans have removed the native ruling class, replacing it with a new monarchy, aristocracy and clerical hierarchy.

Thomas Becket is a Saxon courtier to King Henry II, who transforms into a determined opponent of the king as the Archbishop of Canterbury.

Plot
Thomas Becket is a advisor and companion of the carousing King Henry II. Henry appoints Becket as Lord Chancellor to have a close confidant in this position whom he can completely control. Henry is more interested in escaping his royal duties through drunken forays onto the hunting grounds and womanizing peasant women. He becomes increasingly dependent on Becket, a Saxon commoner, who arranges these debaucheries when he is not busy running Henry's court. This foments great resentment on the part of Henry's Norman noblemen, who distrust and envy this Saxon upstart, as well as Henry's wife Queen Eleanor and Henry's mother Empress Matilda, who see Becket as an unnatural and unseemly influence upon the royal personage.

Henry finds himself in continuous conflict with the elderly Archbishop of Canterbury, who opposes the taxation of Church property to support Henry's military campaigns in France. During one of his campaigns in coastal France, he receives word that the old archbishop has passed away. In a burst of inspiration, Henry exercises his prerogative to pick the next Archbishop and informs an astonished Becket that he is the royal choice.

Shortly thereafter, Becket sides with the Church, throwing Henry into a fury. One of the main bones of contention is Thomas' excommunication of Lord Gilbert, one of Henry's most loyal stalwarts, for seizing and ordering the killing of a priest who had been accused of sexual indiscretions with a young girl, before the priest can even be handed over for ecclesiastical trial. Gilbert then refused to acknowledge his transgressions and seek absolution.

The King has a dramatic secret meeting with the Bishop of London in his cathedral. These attempts fall flat when Becket, in full ecclesiastic garb, confronts his accusers outside the rectory and announces that as Archbishop he will petition the Pope for a ecclesiastical trial, causing Henry to laugh and bitterly note the irony of having his friend turn into his enemy as his own doing. 

Becket escapes to France where he encounters the conniving yet sympathetic King Louis. King Louis sees in Becket a means by which he can further his favourite pastime, tormenting the arrogant English. Louis provides refuge for Becket at the Abbey of Saint Martin while the English sent emissaries to retrieve now fugitive Becket.

Becket then travels to the Vatican, where he begs the Pope to allow him to renounce his position and retire to a monastery as an ordinary priest. The Pope reminds Becket that he has an obligation as a matter of principle to return to England and take a stand against civil interference in Church matters. Becket yields to this decision and asks Louis to arrange a meeting with Henry on the beaches at Normandy. Henry asks Becket whether or not he loved him and Becket replied that he loved Henry to the best of his ability. A shaky truce is declared and Becket is allowed to return to England.

Henry then rapidly sinks into drunken fixation over Becket and his perceived betrayal. The barons worsen his mood by pointing out that Becket has become a folk hero among the vanquished Saxons, who are ever restive and resentful of their Norman conquerors. During a drunken rage, Henry asks "Will no one rid me of this meddlesome priest?" His faithful barons hear this and proceed quickly to Canterbury, where they put Thomas and his Saxon deputy, Brother John, to the sword. A badly shaken Henry then undergoes a penance by whipping at the hands of Saxon monks.

Henry, fresh from his whipping, informs the barons that the ones who killed Becket will be found and justly punished. He then publicly proclaims to the crowd outside the church of his arrangement for Thomas Becket to be canonized a saint.

Preservation
The Academy Film Archive preserved Becket in 2003.

Cast
 Richard Burton – Thomas Becket, Archbishop of Canterbury
 Peter O'Toole – King Henry II of England
 John Gielgud – King Louis VII of France
 Paolo Stoppa (voice: Robert Rietti) – Pope Alexander III
 Donald Wolfit – Gilbert Foliot, Bishop of London
 David Weston – Brother John
 Martita Hunt – Empress Matilda, Henry II's mother
 Pamela Brown – Eleanor of Aquitaine, wife of Henry II
 Siân Phillips – Gwendolen - Becket's lover & a Welsh noblewoman who is a captive of Henry II
 Felix Aylmer – Theobald of Bec, Archbishop of Canterbury
 Gino Cervi – Cardinal Zambelli
 Percy Herbert – Baron
 Niall MacGinnis – Baron
 Christopher Rhodes – Baron
 Peter Jeffrey – Baron
 Inigo Jackson – Robert de Beaumont
 John Phillips – Bishop of Winchester
 Frank Pettingell – Bishop of York
 Hamilton Dyce – Bishop of Chichester
 Jennifer Hilary – Peasant's daughter
 Véronique Vendell – Marie, a French peasant girl that Henry has a tryst with
 Graham Stark – The Pope's Secretary
 Jack Taylor – a villager
 Victor Spinetti – French tailor
 Edward Woodward – Clement

Historicity

Most of the historical inaccuracies in the film are from the play, as Anouilh was writing drama rather than a history, and he took dramatic licence.

The major inaccuracy is the depiction of Becket as a Saxon who has risen to a perceived Norman social standing, when in fact the historical Thomas Becket was a Norman (while Henry was an Angevin). Anouilh did this because he had based the play on a 19th-century account that described Becket as a Saxon. He had been informed of this error before his play was produced, but decided against correcting it because it would undermine a key point of conflict, and because "history might eventually rediscover that Becket was a Saxon, after all."

Becket is depicted as Henry's loyal "drinking pal", who assists him with illicit romantic entanglements and drunken hunting exercises, but who becomes saintly and responsible after his appointment as Archbishop. Passing mention is made in the film of the Constitutions of Clarendon (simply as the "Sixteen Articles"); the struggle between Becket and Henry is boiled down to their conflict over Lord Gilbert's murder of the captive priest. In no way is Becket depicted as a man who desired special legal privileges (defrocking rather than prison) for his clergy, as some believe.

Henry's mother, Empress Matilda, died in 1167, three years before the treaty of Fréteval allowed Becket to return in England. Henry appears to not have any respect for his mother and treats her as something of an annoyance, a rather drastic departure from what is generally held as historical fact. Empress Matilda was Henry's sole parent for much of his childhood, and she was instrumental in shaping Henry into the fierce warrior and skilled administrator he was. Far from seeing his mother as a burden, Henry seems to have adored Matilda and relied heavily on her advice and guidance until her death.

Henry's wife, Eleanor of Aquitaine, was in fact beautiful, and highly educated. She was known to have a amicable marriage with Henry despite his mistresses and frequent absences. She is shown publicly rebuking Henry in a scene near the end of the film, when in fact Eleanor, whatever private reservations she may have had, is not known to have ever behaved in such a manner in public. During the same scene, she says she will go to her father to complain of Henry's treatment of her; however, her father William X, Duke of Aquitaine had died decades before, when Eleanor was just 15 years old. 

Also, the film only shows four sons of Henry and Eleanor. In actuality, Henry and Eleanor had eight children, five sons and three daughters. While the eldest son, William, had died before the events of the film, the three daughters are neglected.

Production financing

The film grossed $9,164,370 at the box office, earning $3 million in rentals.

Awards and nominations

Legacy

Becket and its spiritual sequel The Lion in Winter were both nominated for Best Picture in their respective years 1964 and 1968. Both lost in years which were considered by many to be Musical Film showdowns, where two high-profile musical films were in contention to win Best Picture: Mary Poppins and winner My Fair Lady against Becket in 1964, Funny Girl and winner Oliver! against The Lion in Winter in 1968.

See also
List of American films of 1964
 List of historical drama films

References

External links

 
 
 
 Becket re-release official website 

1964 films
1960s biographical drama films
1960s historical drama films
British biographical drama films
British historical drama films
1960s English-language films
Cultural depictions of Thomas Becket
Cultural depictions of Eleanor of Aquitaine
Henry II of England
Cultural depictions of Empress Matilda
Films about Catholicism
Films about Catholic priests
Biographical films about English royalty
Films based on works by Jean Anouilh
Films about religion
Films set in England
Films set in the 12th century
Films set in Kent
Best Drama Picture Golden Globe winners
Films featuring a Best Drama Actor Golden Globe winning performance
Films whose writer won the Best Adapted Screenplay Academy Award
Paramount Pictures films
Films directed by Peter Glenville
Films produced by Hal B. Wallis
Epic films based on actual events
Historical epic films
Films scored by Laurence Rosenthal
Martyrdom in fiction
Films with screenplays by Edward Anhalt
1964 drama films
1960s British films